The General Dutch Typographers' Union (ANTB) was an early trade union, representing typographers in the Netherlands.

The union was founded on 30 May 1866, the first national trade union in the Netherlands.  It aimed to increased minimum wages from 6 to 9 guilders per ten-hour day.  Despite attempts by employers to sack union members, the union endured.  In later years, it was affiliated to the Dutch Confederation of Trade Unions (NVV).

In 1945, it merged with the Dutch Graphical Union, the Dutch Litho-, Photo- and Chemographers' Union, and the Dutch Union of Managers in the Graphic Industry, to form the General Dutch Printing Union.

Presidents
1894: Paulus Hols
1914: Feike van der Wal
1937: Barend Ponstein

References

Printing trade unions
Trade unions established in 1866
Trade unions disestablished in 1945
Trade unions in the Netherlands